Allyn Johnson (born January 27, 1938) is an American sports shooter. He competed in the men's 25 metre rapid fire pistol event at the 1984 Summer Olympics.

References

1938 births
Living people
American male sport shooters
Olympic shooters of the United States
Shooters at the 1984 Summer Olympics
Sportspeople from Los Angeles